Daniel Richard Green (born 9 July 1988) is an English semi-professional footballer and coach who last played as a right winger for  club Concord Rangers.

Green spent his youth with Charlton Athletic and Northampton Town, before he joined Nottingham Forest in 2004. He dropped into non-league with Bishop's Stortford after picking up a bad injury at Forest. His performances earned him a return to the Football League with Dagenham & Redbridge in May 2009. Green won the 2010 League Two play-off Final at Wembley Stadium and promotion to League One with Dagenham, before he was sold on to Charlton for a £350,000 fee in June 2011. He helped the club win the League One title in 2011–12, but struggled for matches in the Championship, and joined Milton Keynes Dons in May 2014 following a short loan spell earlier in 2013–14. He was also promoted out of League One with the Dons in 2014–15, and was then allowed to move on to Luton Town in July 2015. He secured a first-team place until breaking his leg in April 2016, which caused him to miss the entire 2016–17 season.

Career

Early career
Green began his career with the youth system at Charlton Athletic before being released at the age of 15. He then signed for Northampton Town, and moved to Nottingham Forest in 2004. In 2008, Green was released by Nottingham Forest after picking up a bad injury and signed for Conference South club Bishop's Stortford after meeting manager Martin Hayes on a coaching course. He later admitted that he probably would have quit football had Bishop's Stortford not expressed an interest in signing him. Green scored four goals in 32 matches for Bishop's Stortford in 2008–09.

Dagenham & Redbridge
In May 2009, Green signed for League Two club Dagenham & Redbridge on a free transfer. He made his debut in a 2–1 win away to Crewe Alexandra on the opening day of 2009–10, in which he was substituted in the 75th minute. Green scored twice on his home debut in a 5–3 victory over Torquay United at Victoria Road a week later. He scored two braces in the space of three days in April, which included three penalties and a direct free kick from 30 yards in a 2–2 draw away to Chesterfield and a 4–1 victory at home to Barnet. Green played in both legs of the play-off semi-final victory over Morecambe, which finished 7–2 on aggregate. He started in the 2010 League Two play-off Final at Wembley Stadium, in which he scored Dagenham's second goal in their 3–2 victory over Rotherham United to win promotion to League One. Green finished the season with 14 goals from 52 appearances and provided 16 assists. He signed a new three-year contract with Dagenham in July 2010. Dagenham were relegated back to League Two at the end of 2010–11 after a 5–0 defeat away to Peterborough United on the final day of the season, but Green was one of the club's stand-out performers, scoring 13 goals and providing 12 assists.

Charlton Athletic
On 29 June 2011, Green was signed by Charlton Athletic for a fee of £350,000, signing a three-year contract. He helped Chris Powell's team win the League One title in 2011–12 and therefore promotion to the Championship in his first season with 32 appearances and three goals. However, he struggled to hold down a first team position in the Championship, making 18 appearances and scoring one goal in 2012–13. On 2 September 2013, Green agreed a six-week loan with League One club Milton Keynes Dons. He made six appearances for the Dons, before returning to The Valley, scoring two goals in 19 appearances for Charlton in 2013–14. At the end of the season, Green was released by the club in May 2014.

Milton Keynes Dons
Green returned to Milton Keynes Dons on 23 May 2014, signing a two-year contract. Manager Karl Robinson said "he gives us another exciting option out wide, to go along with Daniel Powell and Dean Bowditch". He made 18 appearances and scored twice in all competitions during the 2014–15 season, as the Dons won promotion to the Championship as runners-up in League One. He left Stadium mk in July 2015 after Milton Keynes Dons agreed to cancel Green's contract a year early.

Luton Town
On 4 July 2015, Green signed a two-year contract with League Two club Luton Town, linking back up with manager John Still who had first signed him at Dagenham & Redbridge in 2009. He made his debut in a 1–1 draw away to Accrington Stanley on the opening day of 2015–16. Green scored his first goals for Luton in consecutive matches when he opened the scoring in a 2–1 win at home to Leyton Orient in the Football League Trophy on 1 September, before netting the final goal in a 3–1 win away to Cambridge United four days later. However, he fell out of favour after Still felt he lacked "urgency" and "passion". In his first league appearance for almost two months, Green opened the scoring in a 2–0 win over Barnet at Kenilworth Road on 14 November. He scored his fourth goal of the season 10 days later in a 4–3 defeat at home to Carlisle United. Green netted a penalty kick after a foul on Craig Mackail-Smith in another 4–3 defeat, on this occasion at home to Northampton Town on 12 December. Green scored his fifth goal in 10 league starts for Luton in a 3–2 win away to Exeter City a week later. On 30 April 2016, Green suffered a double leg break during a 2–0 defeat away to Northampton Town. He finished 2015–16 with 30 appearances and six goals. Green missed the entire 2016–17 season as a result of the injury, and was released when his contract expired at the end of the season. Manager Nathan Jones said "we've put it out that Danny won't be moving forward with us, but Danny knew that and we've got to make sure he comes back safely and prolongs his career and we think we've done that".

Chelmsford City
Green went on trial with newly relegated League Two club Port Vale in July 2017, before signing for National League South club Chelmsford City in August 2017. On 26 August 2017, Green made his debut as a 58th-minute substitute in a 2–0 win over Truro City.

Concord Rangers
On 13 May 2018, Green signed for fellow National League South club Concord Rangers on a two-year contract. Green took on the role of player-coach in June 2020.

On 16 October 2022, it was announced that Green had left the club.

Career statistics

Honours
Dagenham & Redbridge
Football League Two play-offs: 2009–10

Charlton Athletic
Football League One: 2011–12

Milton Keynes Dons
Football League One runner-up: 2014–15

References

External links

Profile at the Concord Rangers F.C. website

1988 births
Living people
Sportspeople from Harlow
English footballers
Association football wingers
Charlton Athletic F.C. players
Northampton Town F.C. players
Nottingham Forest F.C. players
Bishop's Stortford F.C. players
Dagenham & Redbridge F.C. players
Milton Keynes Dons F.C. players
Luton Town F.C. players
Chelmsford City F.C. players
Concord Rangers F.C. players
National League (English football) players
English Football League players
Association football coaches